Mrs. Mills, Such a Perfect Neighbor (French: Mme Mills, une voisine si parfaite) is a French comedy directed by Sophie Marceau starring herself, Pierre Richard and Nicolas Vaude. It was theatrically released in March 2018 shot and set in Shanghai and Paris in French, English and Chinese. It premiered at the 2018 L'Alpe d'Huez Film Festival.

Synopsis 
An elderly professional French crook (Mr. Rosenberg / Léonard Chomsky) who would do anything including cross-dressing to commit his mischiefs manages to make his way as 'Mrs. Mills' into Hélène Mercier's home, a workaholic lady obsessed with books. There he discovers an invualuable object inherited from her grand-mother which she wouldn't sell. Mercier is a head of publishing looking for "an optimistic heroine" whom she found in Mrs. Mills. She makes him a big star until the usurpation is revealed and she needs him to stay in character. The film deals with the extraordinary situations generated by this premise.

Cast 

 Sophie Marceau: Hélène Mercier
 Pierre Richard: Albert Dupont, alias Mrs. Scarlett Mills / Mr. Rosenberg / Léonard Chomsky
 Nicolas Vaude: Edward
 Bastien Ughetto: Charles
 Léna Bréban: Mathilde
 Dong Fu Lin: Ming Pei
 Gaël Zaks: Stephen Boyd
 Stéphane Bissot: the guardian
 Daniel Goldenberg: the librarian

In their own role
 Stephane Bern
 Patrice Carmouze
 Régis Mailhot
 Nikos Aliagas (voice only)
 Augustin Trapenard (voice only)
 Camille Combal (voice only)

See also 

 Cinema of France
 List of French language films
 Cross-dressing in film and television
 Cross-gender acting
 En femme

References

External links 

 

2018 films
2010s French-language films
Chinese-language films
French comedy films
Films set in France
Films set in Paris
Films shot in Paris
Films set in China
Films set in Shanghai
Films shot in Shanghai
Cross-dressing in film
2018 comedy films
2010s English-language films
Belgian comedy films
2018 multilingual films
French multilingual films
2010s French films